The 1949–50 season was Cardiff City F.C.'s 23rd season in the Football League. They competed in the 22-team Division Two, then the second tier of English football, finishing tenth.

Season review

Football League Second Division

Partial league table

Results by round

Players
First team squad.

Fixtures and results

Second Division

Source

FA Cup

Source

Welsh Cup

Source

See also

List of Cardiff City F.C. seasons

References

Cardiff City F.C. seasons
Association football clubs 1949–50 season
Card